Wang Ji (1463–1539) was a Ming physician who published an early medical casebook.

Works
 Shishan yian [Stone mountain medical case histories], 1520.
 Zhenjiu Wen Dui [Acumoxa Questions and Answers], 1530
 Tui qiu shi yi [Ascertain the master’s meanings]
 Waike lili [Patterns and Examples for External Medicine]

References

External links
 Portrait of Wang Ji

1463 births
1539 deaths
16th-century Chinese physicians
Ming dynasty writers
Chinese non-fiction writers
Writers from Anhui
Physicians from Anhui
People from Huangshan
15th-century Chinese physicians